Morad El Khattouti El Horami (Arabic: مراد الخطوطي, Morad El Khattouti; born 4 March 1999), known mononymously as Morad, is a Spanish rapper. He topped the PROMUSICAE singles charts with "Bzrp Music Sessions Vol. 47" in 2021 and with "Pelele" in 2022.

Early life
Morad was born on 5 March 1999 in the La Florida neighbourhood of L'Hospitalet de Llobregat, Barcelona metropolitan area, to Moroccan parents; his father was from Nador and his mother is from Larache, the former whom abandoned the family when Morad was young. He spent some of his childhood in a children's home. He began rapping with friends at the age of 14 via WhatsApp.

Career
Morad popularised in Spain the abbreviation "M.D.L.R" (Mec de la Rue, French for "street boy"), used by French drill musicians of Maghrebi origin. His 2019 debut album and 2020 extended play were titled MDLR and MDLR 2.0 respectively.

Morad collaborated with Argentine producer Bizarrap on "Bzrp Music Sessions Vol. 47", which topped the PROMUSICAE singles chart for two weeks in late December 2021. His song "Pelele" topped the same chart the following month.

Personal life

Relationships
In the early hours of 27 June 2021, Morad's ex-girlfriend used the key that she kept from their relationship to break into his apartment on the Plaça d'Europa and stab his new girlfriend as she slept next to him. By 9 July, the Civil Guard had found no trace of the attacker's whereabouts. She was convicted in February 2023 and sentenced to nine months in prison; the judge gave a lenient sentence as she believed the attacker was enraged by seeing Morad in bed with another woman.

Legal issues
Morad and a friend were charged with attempted robbery and threats, alleged to have taken place in the Barcelona neighbourhood of El Putget i Farró in April 2018. In 2022, the prosecution requested a prison sentence of 2 years, while the defence said that it was a case of mistaken identity. The pair were acquitted when the court heard from a police agent that the images of the suspects did not match the accused.

In April 2022, Morad was arrested for not attending a court hearing for driving without a licence. Two months later, he was arrested again for reckless driving without a licence. In July 2022, he was arrested for disrespecting the police when a car he was a passenger in was stopped for passing a red traffic light.

In July 2022, a judge opened a case against Morad for uploading a video of a member of the Mossos d'Esquadra who had fined him for a parking violation, alongside the false accusation that the police officer was a child abuser.

In October 2022, Morad was arrested on suspicion of having paid young people in La Florida to commit arson. As part of his bail conditions, he was not allowed to return to the neighbourhood.

In February 2023, Morad was arrested and bailed in L'Hospitalet de Llobregat for allegedly threatening a police officer.

Political views
Morad has voiced support for King Mohammed VI of Morocco and the Moroccan occupation of Western Sahara. In July 2022, a fan in Ourense threw a flag of Western Sahara on stage, which he picked up, believing it to be a flag of Palestine. He apologised to his Moroccan fans for the misunderstanding.

Discography

Studio albums
M.D.L.R (2019)
K y B Cap. 1 (2022)

Extended plays
M.D.L.R 2.0 (2020)

Awards and nominations

References

External links

 Morad at AllMusic
 Morad discography at Discogs

1999 births
Living people
People from L'Hospitalet de Llobregat
Spanish people of Moroccan descent
Spanish male rappers
Singers from Catalonia
People acquitted of robbery